This is a list of record home attendances of Swedish football clubs. It lists the highest attendance of all 60 Swedish Allsvenskan, Superettan, and Division 1 clubs for a home match. In several cases records were achieved at a former ground rather than the club's current location. For example, IF Elfsborg's record was set at Ryavallen, not their current home, the Borås Arena.

Records

Current teams

Current lower-level teams

References

Swedish football club statistics
Swedish football-related lists
Sweden record
 
Football
Sweden